Harriet Dart and Lesley Pattinama Kerkhove were the defending champions but Dart chose not to participate. Pattinama Kerkhove partnered alongside Bibiane Schoofs but lost in the quarterfinals to Marine Partaud and Ioana Loredana Roșca.

Isabelle Haverlag and Justina Mikulskytė won the title, defeating Sofya Lansere and Oksana Selekhmeteva in the final, 6–4, 6–2.

Seeds

Draw

Draw

References
Main Draw

Engie Open de Seine-et-Marne - Doubles